Deathless  is the fifth studio album by American metalcore band Miss May I. It was released on August 7, 2015, through Rise Records. The album was produced by Joey Sturgis, who produced their first two albums (Apologies Are for the Weak and Monument), and Nick Sampson. The album was included at number 45 on Rock Sounds top 50 releases of 2015 list. This is the last album the band released on Rise Records.

Track listing

Personnel 

Miss May I
Levi Benton – lead vocals, lyrics
B.J. Stead – lead guitar, backing vocals
Justin Aufdemkampe – rhythm guitar, backing vocals
Ryan Neff – bass, clean vocals, lyrics
Jerod Boyd – drums

Production
Produced by Joey Sturgis and Nick Sampson
Management by Craig Jennings and Andrew Snape (Raw Power Management)
Publicity by Austin Griswold (Secret Service PR, US) and Hayley Connelly (Little Press, UK)
Booking by Dave Shapiro (The Agency Group)

Charts

References
 Citations

Sources

 

2015 albums
Miss May I albums
Rise Records albums
Albums produced by Joey Sturgis